Guarujá Civil Metropolitan Airport  is an airport under construction to serve Guarujá, Santos and the Santos Metropolitan Region in Brazil.

It is operated by Infraero.

Some of its facilities will be shared with Santos Air Force Base of the Brazilian Air Force.

History
Plans to use the site of Santos Air Force Base also as a civil aerodrome started in 2018. In 2019 the Ministry of Infrastructure and the Brazilian Air Force signed the agreement. 

On July 3, 2020 Infraero started to manage the civil portion of the site and to conduct works regarding the construction of a terminal.

It is expected that the facility will open on the second semester of 2023.

Access

See also

List of airports in Brazil
Santos Air Force Base

References

External links

Airports in São Paulo (state)
Baixada Santista
Santos, São Paulo
Proposed airports